Mykhayliv is a Ukrainian surname, derived from the Ukrainian first name Mykhailo or Mykhaylo. It may refer to:

 Roman Mykhayliv (born 2003), Ukrainian football player
 Vitaliy Mykhayliv (born 2005), Ukrainian football player

See also
 

Ukrainian-language surnames
Patronymic surnames